Jorge Damián Zamogilny (also known as "El Ruso", born 5 January 1980 in Buenos Aires) is an Argentine former professional footballer. He is a Mexican naturalized citizen.

Zamogilny started his football career in the youth team of Club Atlético Independiente in Argentina. He moved to Mexican football before he ever played for the Independiente first team. After several years in the lower leagues of Mexican football, he won promotion to the Mexican Primera División with Puebla. He plays as a midfielder and has played in Puebla's starting lineup in many games. In 2008, he joined Mexican side Tecos UAG.

Honours
Puebla
Primera A: Clausura 2007
Ascenso a Primera: 2007

References

External links
 
 
 
  
  

1980 births
Living people
Argentine footballers
Mexican footballers
Argentine emigrants to Mexico
Naturalized citizens of Mexico
Argentine expatriate footballers
Footballers from Buenos Aires
Club Atlético Independiente footballers
Club Puebla players
Tecos F.C. footballers
Atlas F.C. footballers
Argentine Primera División players
Liga MX players
Expatriate footballers in Argentina
Argentine people of Russian descent
Mexican people of Russian descent
Association football midfielders